James Keith Marshall (February 13, 1800 – December 2, 1862) was a Virginia planter and politician. He served in both houses of the Virginia General Assembly, including after Virginia declared its secession during the American Civil War.

Early and family life
Born to Chief Justice John Marshall and his wife Mary Willis Ambler Marshall (1766–1831) in Richmond on February 13, 1800, James Keith Marshall had several brothers and sisters. He attended Harvard College, as did all but one of his brothers, but never graduated.

He married Claudia Hamilton Burwell Marshall (1800–1884) in 1821, and they had eleven children, many of whom died in childhood.

Career

Marshall withdrew from Harvard in early 1815 after being disciplined and his brother John Marshall, Jr. expelled, and soon began a career as an investment banker in Philadelphia with the house of Willing & Francis. He returned to Fauquier County, Virginia circa 1821 and received a plantation from his father as a wedding present. He then farmed using enslaved labor, owning 47 slaves in the 1830 census, many slaves in the 1840 census after his father's death, and 55 slaves in the 1850 census.

After his elder brother Thomas's unexpected death in 1835, first his brother Edward Carrington Marshall would run for and win one of the county's two seats in the Virginia General Assembly, and then after Edward fell from a horse and became disabled, James Keith Marshall ran and represented the county from 1839 until 1841 (winning re-election once, but losing in 1838). In 1853, voters elected James Keith Marshall to the Virginia Senate, where he represented Fauquier and neighboring Rappahannock Counties. He succeeded George W. Brent, and was re-elected in 1857.
After Virginia declared its secession, Marshall continued to serve in the Senate, but died in office on December 2, 1862. His cousin Alexander J. Marshall succeeded him.

James Keith Marshall was buried in the family plot in the cemetery of Leeds Episcopal Church.

References

1800 births
1862 deaths
People from Fauquier County, Virginia
Members of the Virginia House of Delegates
19th-century American politicians
Virginia state senators
American slave owners